Daniel Yaw Agyei (also spelled Adjei; born 10 November 1989) is a Ghanaian professional footballer who plays for Ethiopian club Sebeta City as a goalkeeper.

Club career
Agyei was born in Dansoman, Ghana.

International career
Agyei represented Ghana at under-20 level and won with the team both the 2009 African Youth Championship and the 2009 FIFA U-20 World Cup. He earned his first senior call to the Black Stars for the World Cup qualification match against Mali. He made his Ghana national team debut on 18 November 2009 in a friendly match against Angola.

Career statistics

International

Honours

International
'Ghana U-20
FIFA U-20 World Cup: 2009
African Youth Championship: 2009

'Ghana
Africa Cup of Nations runner-up: 2010

References

External links

1989 births
Living people
Ghanaian footballers
Ghanaian expatriate footballers
Association football goalkeepers
Ghana under-20 international footballers
Ghana international footballers
2010 Africa Cup of Nations players
Free State Stars F.C. players
Liberty Professionals F.C. players
Medeama SC players
Simba S.C. players
Jimma Aba Jifar F.C. players
Ghana Premier League players
South African Premier Division players
2010 FIFA World Cup players
2012 Africa Cup of Nations players
2013 Africa Cup of Nations players
African Games gold medalists for Ghana
African Games medalists in football
People from Greater Accra Region
Competitors at the 2011 All-Africa Games
Ghanaian expatriate sportspeople in South Africa
Ghanaian expatriate sportspeople in Tanzania
Ghanaian expatriate sportspeople in Ethiopia
Expatriate soccer players in South Africa
Expatriate footballers in Tanzania
Expatriate footballers in Ethiopia
Tanzanian Premier League players